Yves De Winter (born 25 May 1987) is a Belgian former professional footballer who played as a goalkeeper.

Club career
After having played for Westerlo, De Winter moved to the Netherlands in August 2011 where he signed for De Graafschap. After one season, he moved to AZ to become the backup behind Esteban Alvarado. He remained at the club for three years before returning to Belgium, signing with Sint-Truiden in 2015. In July 2017, he signed with Roda JC Kerkrade on a one-year deal. He later played for Roeselare and Antwerp, before retiring from football in April 2021, after having been a free agent for a year.

Honours
AZ
 KNVB Cup: 2012–13

References

External links
 Voetbal International profile 

1987 births
Living people
Belgian footballers
Association football goalkeepers
Belgium under-21 international footballers
Footballers at the 2008 Summer Olympics
Olympic footballers of Belgium
Belgian Pro League players
Eredivisie players
K.V.C. Westerlo players
De Graafschap players
AZ Alkmaar players
Sint-Truidense V.V. players
Roda JC Kerkrade players
K.S.V. Roeselare players
Royal Antwerp F.C. players
People from Lier, Belgium
Footballers from Antwerp Province